Ciudadela is a city in Greater Buenos Aires, Buenos Aires Province, Argentina. It is located in the Tres de Febrero Partido, immediately to the west of the neighborhood of Liniers in Buenos Aires city proper. It is separated from the city by General Paz avenue.

History
Home to a cattle ranch in colonial times (Rancho de Castro), the area was the site of a base of operations for Viceroy Santiago de Liniers during the British invasions of the Río de la Plata of 1806. The first settlement was named Villa Liniers in his honor, and was the site of a major military camp after 1902. The town began to take shape with the arrival of the Ferrocarril Oeste railway in 1910, and was officially established that year. Ciudadela gradually grew around the railway station, and eventually merged into the Greater Buenos Aires urban agglomeration.

Fuerte Apache, whose official name is "Barrio Ejército de los Andes", is a public housing development in Ciudadela. The subject of ongoing controversy, its colloquial name stems from Fort Apache, The Bronx, a 1981 movie about a crime-ridden part of New York City.

Ciudadela had 73,155 inhabitants according to 2001 census, and features a lively commerce hub along Avenida Rivadavia, as well as two Jewish cemeteries. The historic barracks are now the Argentine Army Museum.

Notable births 
 Alfredo Alcón - actor
Thiago Almada - professional footballer
 Fernando Gago - professional footballer
 Carlos Tevez - professional footballer

Neighborhoods 

 Fuerte Apache
 Villa Reconquista 
 Villa General Arenales 
 Villa El Paredón or Los Russos 
 Villa Matienzo 
 Barrio San Eduardo 
 Barrio Ramón Carrillo  
 Villa Herminia 
 Villa General Paz 
 Villa La Paz 
 Villa Maldonado 
 Villa Weigel 
 Barrio Neptuno 54

External links 

 Cabildo Abierto de Ciudadela
 History of Ciudadela

Tres de Febrero Partido
Populated places in Buenos Aires Province
Populated places established in 1910
Cities in Argentina
Argentina